Team Socceroo Football Club (TSFC) is a football club based in Metro Manila, Philippines. It first joined the United Football League as Team Socceroo through its second division in 2012. From the 2014–2015 season, the TSFC played in the Division 1 of the United Football League, the country's top premiere football league after topping Division 2 in the 2013 season.

In 2015, it changed its name into Sigla F.C. and was to play at the UFL under the new name starting the 2016 season but ultimately withdrew from the league. The club reverted to its older name in 2017.

History

Foundation and early years
Team Socceroo F.C. was founded in 2005 by the Reyes brothers led by Jose "Wool" Reyes, the eldest brother. The brothers along with their friends and old teammates from PAREF Southridge School formed a team and began joining football tournaments and festivals.

The TSFC later opened its first football camp. In 2010, TSFC Camp was launched at Corinthian's Village football field in Quezon City which was deemed a success. In 2011, the club established two more football camps in San Lorenzo Village football field in Makati and Tahanan Village football field in Parañaque and there are further plans to open more football camps in other Metro Manila.

United Football League
In the third quarter of 2011, Team Socceroo competed in the United Football League (UFL) Cup and finished 12th out of 28 teams. For the 2012 UFL season, TSFC got admitted to the 2nd Division of the UFL. In 2013, they topped Division 2 and earned promotion to the first division where they competed for two seasons.

In 2015, the name of the club was changed to Sigla Football Club, the name which the club was supposed to compete under for the 2016 United Football League. The club reverted to its older name in 2017.

Post-UFL
Since Team Soccerroo left the UFL it decided to focus more on running its youth academies. In 2018, TSFC contributed participants at the 6th Gazprom Football for Friendship (F4F) World Championship in Russia. TSFC youth player AJ Boy Victoriano played as a midfielder for the multinational Team Komodo Dragon which finished runners-up in the tournament. Matteo De Venecia also a youth TSFC member participated as a journalist.

They also participate in the 7's Football League.

Team image
The club positions itself as the football club for the family and is thus nicknamed Club ng Pamilya The club's motto is Plenus Pectus which translates from Latin to English means "Full Heart". The motto also served as a personal motto for the club's founder Wool Reyes.

Crest

Records

Key
Tms. = Number of teams
Pos. = Position in league
TBD  = To be determined
DNQ  = Did not qualify
Note: Performances of the club indicated here was after the UFL Division 1 created (as a semi-pro league) in 2009.

Honors

Domestic competitions
 United Football League Division 2
Winners: 2013

References

External links

Association football clubs established in 2005
Football clubs in the Philippines
2005 establishments in the Philippines
Sports teams in Metro Manila